Philip Henry (born April 16, 1971) is an American former rower.

Biography
Henry trained in Princeton, New Jersey, but grew up in Seattle and attended the University of Washington. He was a member of the American eight crew that won the gold medal at the 1997 World Rowing Championships. In 1999 he was World Champion in the coxed pair and won gold in the eight at the Pan American Games in Winnipeg. He was an alternate at the 2000 Summer Olympics for the United States.

References

External links
 

1971 births
Living people
American male rowers
Pan American Games gold medalists for the United States
Pan American Games medalists in rowing
World Rowing Championships medalists for the United States
University of Washington alumni
Rowers from Seattle
Rowers at the 1999 Pan American Games
Medalists at the 1999 Pan American Games